Tayuka Nakanishi is an active Japanese fashion designer. Along with Akira Takeuchi, she is founder and main designer of the Theatre Products fashion brand, which is popular in the Harajuku and Shibuya areas of Tokyo, known as centers of youth fashion.

References

Year of birth missing (living people)
Living people
Japanese fashion designers
Japanese women fashion designers
Place of birth missing (living people)